Scharfenberg Castle may refer to:

 Scharfenberg Castle (Brilon), a castle in the Hochsauerland, Germany
 Scharfenberg Castle (Donzdorf), a former castle of the counts of Rechberg
 Scharfenberg Castle (Palatinate), a ruined hill castle in the Palatinate, Germany
 Schloss Scharfenberg, a stately home in Saxony, Germany